Senator Haven may refer to:

Erastus Otis Haven (1820–1881), Massachusetts State Senate
John J. De Haven (1845–1913), California State Senate

See also
Palmer E. Havens (1818–1886), New York State Senate